Bącka Huta  is a village in the administrative district of Gmina Sierakowice, within Kartuzy County, Pomeranian Voivodeship, in northern Poland. The village has a population of 261.

For details of the history of the region, see History of Pomerania.

References

Villages in Kartuzy County